East Lake Tohopekaliga (East Lake Toho for short) is a lake in Osceola County, Florida, United States. Three places surround the lake, they are St. Cloud on the south shore, Narcoossee and Runnymede on the east shore.

See also
 Lake Tohopekaliga
 Narcoossee

References

External links

Lakes of Osceola County, Florida
Lakes of Florida